Upul Sumathipala (born 2 March 1959) is a Sri Lankan former first-class cricketer who played for Galle Cricket Club.

References

External links
 

1959 births
Living people
Sri Lankan cricketers
Galle Cricket Club cricketers
Cricketers from Galle